Paloma Bernardi (born April 21, 1985) is a Brazilian actress. She became known in Brazil playing the character Mia in the telenovela Viver a Vida.

Biography
Bernardi was born in São Paulo, Brazil. She is the daughter of businessman Nestor Bernardi and the plastic artist and former dancer Dil Bernardi. In 2005 she graduated from Senac in the Technical Course of Actor presenting the play Faces D'Alma. In 2006 Paloma graduated in the College of Radio and TV of the Methodist University of São Paulo.

Filmography

Television

Film

Videoclip

Theater

Awards and nominations

References

External links

 
 

1985 births
Living people
Actresses from São Paulo
Brazilian people of Italian descent
Brazilian television actresses
Brazilian film actresses
20th-century Brazilian actresses
21st-century Brazilian actresses
Methodist University of São Paulo alumni